Fried is the second solo album by Julian Cope.

Background 
Fried was released on 9 November 1984, just six months after Cope's first solo album World Shut Your Mouth. Cope retained the guitarist Steve Lovell and the guest oboe player Kate St. John from the previous album, but added his Drayton Bassett musical foil Donald Ross Skinner on rhythm and slide guitars, the former Waterboys drummer Chris Whitten and, on one track, the former Mighty Wah! guitarist, Steve "Brother Johnno" Johnson.

The album was much more raw in approach than its predecessor. In many respects, it prefigured the looser and more mystical style which Cope followed and was praised for in the following decade. Notoriously, the sleeve showed a naked Cope crouched on top of the Alvecote Mound slag heap clad only in a large turtle shell. Song topics and approaches included early examples of Cope's subsequent tendency to mythologise his own life and connect it to legend and ritual ("Reynard the Fox" combined English folk tales with reference to Cope's notorious onstage stomach-slashing incident the previous year; "Bill Drummond Said" was an oblique fable about Cope's former manager and the future KLF mainstay) and his developing interest in paganism ("O King of Chaos", which Cope later revealed was an invocation to Odin). Several songs had little or no backing, with Cope accompanying himself.

Despite receiving better reviews than its ill-fated predecessor, Fried sold even more poorly at the time, as did the accompanying single, "Sunspots". The commercial failure of the album led to Polygram dropping Cope. He subsequently found a new manager, the artist and musician-cum-prankster Cally Callomon, and signed a new deal with Island Records. Skinner and Whitten remained with Cope for the next album, Saint Julian.

Bill Drummond's 1986 album, The Man, replied in kind to "Bill Drummond Said", with a song titled "Julian Cope Is Dead".

In 2007, The Guardian included the album in their list of "1000 Albums to Hear Before You Die".

Track listing

2015 expanded edition
The first disc of the expanded edition contains the ten tracks from the original album.

Chart positions

Personnel 
Julian Cope – vocals, bass guitar, rhythm guitar, piano, organ
Steve Lovell – electric guitar, recorder solo on "Sunspots"
Donald Ross Skinner – slide and electric guitar
Chris Whitten – drums
Steve "Brother Johnno" Johnson – electric guitar solo on "Sunspots"
Kate St. John – oboe
David Carter - tuba on "Sunspots"
Technical
Paul King - production supervisor
Paul "Chas" Watkins - engineer, recorded by
P. St. John Nettleton - art direction, design
Donato Cinicolo - photography

References 

1984 albums
Julian Cope albums
Mercury Records albums